De Nittis is an Italian surname. Notable people with the surname include:

Francesco De Nittis (1933–2014), Italian Roman Catholic archbishop and diplomat
Giuseppe De Nittis (1846–1884), Italian painter

Italian-language surnames